Shanny or Shannie may refer to:

Fish
 Prickleback, a family (Stichaeidae) of blennies
 Lipophrys pholis, a species of Combtooth blennies

People
 Shannie Barnett (1919–1991), American basketball player
 Shannie Duff, Canadian politician
 Brendan Shanahan (born 1969), Canadian National Hockey League player and executive
 Mike Shanahan (born 1952), National Football League coach

See also
 Shannon (disambiguation)